DR-5 is of one of the main highways in the Dominican Republic. The highway begins at a T-interchange with DR-1 in Villa Bisonó in the small town of Navarrete located about 20 kilometers northwest of Santiago de los Caballeros. Its endpoint is the municipal district Las Galeras. Initially DR-5 starts north of Santiago with a junction with DR-1. DR-1 continues northwest to Monte Cristi while DR-5 turns northeast to the Cities of Puerto Plata, Sosua, and its ending point at the Samana Province.

See also
Highways and routes in the Dominican Republic

References 

Highways and routes in the Dominican Republic